Tony Rice Sings Gordon Lightfoot is a compilation album by American guitarist Tony Rice, released in 1996. It contains tracks written by Gordon Lightfoot and previously recorded by Rice, plus a previously unreleased track, "Whispers of the North".

Track listing 
All songs by Gordon Lightfoot
 "Go My Way" – 2:48
 "Home from the Forest" – 4:17
 "Fine as Fine Can Be" – 3:24
 "Let It Ride" – 2:59
 "I'm Not Sayin'" – 2:15
 "Bitter Green" – 2:43
 "You Are What I Am" – 2:22
 "Shadows" – 3:43
 "Walls" – 1:59
 "Whispers of the North" – 4:17
 "Ten Degrees (Getting Colder)" – 2:18
 "The Wreck of the Edmund Fitzgerald" – 4:59
 "Early Morning Rain" – 3:04
 "Whisper My Name" – 3:19
 "Sixteen Miles" – 2:45
 "Cold on the Shoulder" – 2:34
 "Song for a Winter's Night" – 3:09

Personnel
Tony Rice – guitar, vocals
Sam Bush – mandolin, violin, background vocals
Norman Blake – guitar, mandolin, vocals
Cole Burgess – saxophone
Kathy Chiavola – harmony vocals
Vassar Clements – fiddle
J. D. Crowe – banjo, vocals
Jerry Douglas – dobro
Bill Emerson – banjo, vocals
Béla Fleck – banjo
Jimmy Gaudreau – mandolin, vocals
Bobby Hicks – violin
Frank Poindexter – dobro
Ron Rice – bass
Wyatt Rice – guitar
Mark Schatz – bass
Rickie Simpkins – fiddle, viola
Ricky Skaggs – vocals, fiddle, mandolin, trombone, viola
Bobby Slone – bass
Bill Wolf – piano
Larry Rice – mandolin, background vocals
Kate Wolf – background vocals 
Todd Phillips – bass

References

1996 compilation albums
Tony Rice compilation albums
Rounder Records compilation albums